Wag the dog is, as a political term, the act of creating a diversion from a damaging issue usually through military force. It stems from the generic use of the term to mean a small and seemingly unimportant entity (the tail) controls a bigger, more important one (the dog). It is usually used by a politician when they are in a scandal, in hopes that people forget about the scandal and focus on the more important issue. The phrase originates in the saying "a dog is smarter than its tail, but if the tail were smarter, then it would wag the dog." The concept has strong intersections with many other aspects of Diversionary foreign policy, particularly the Rally 'round the flag effect, as wag the dog actions tend to both distract and seek to bolster support through these actions.

First usage

The earliest usage of the phrase in politics found in print is in an article originating in 1871, discussing one Democratic convention. In the article, the author references the popular play Our American Cousin, which Abraham Lincoln was watching six years earlier when he was assassinated by actor John Wilkes Booth. In the play, the character Lord Dundreary is a sympathetic character who constantly utters confused catch phrases a-la Yogi Berra, which were known at that time as Dundrearyisms:

The generic phrase, then and now, indicates a backwards situation in which a small and seemingly unimportant entity (the tail) controls a bigger, more important one (the dog). It was again used in the 1960s, as in the economic advice "don't let the tax tail wag the investment dog".

In fiction 
While it was first used in 1871, the term did not gain political popularity until the 1990s, with the success of the 1993 novel Wag the Dog. In it, a plan is hatched to secure President George H. W. Bush's reelection by having Hollywood produce a fake war to improve his popular approval.

In 1997, a film of the same name came out based on that novel. In the film, a sitting US president becomes embroiled in scandal weeks before he is up for re-election, and a spin doctor comes up with the scheme of hiring a Hollywood producer to fabricate military action to save his campaign.

Real world usage 

As political polarization rose and continues to rise, the concept has been commonly referenced in the United States.

During the Monica Lewinsky scandal, President Clinton ordered missile strikes in Afghanistan and Sudan shortly after the story broke, drawing comparisons with the film and popularizing usage of the phrase. During impeachment proceedings, Clinton also bombed Iraq, drawing stronger "wag the dog" allusions. With the scandal still on the public's mind in March 1999, his administration launched a bombing campaign against Yugoslavia. These action drew more attention to the phrase, growing its popularity.

It has been used multiple times for former President Donald Trump. First, in  April 2017 when he conducted airstrikes against Syria during an investigation of Russian interference in the 2016 United States elections, and again in January 2020, after a U.S. airstrike assassination of Iran's General Qasem Soleimani occurred during first impeachment trials of former President Trump.

See also
Diversionary foreign policy
Cart before the horse
Dead cat strategy
Rally 'round the flag effect

References

Political terminology of the United States
Political concepts
Metaphors referring to dogs